The Chicago Defender Building, located at 3435 S. Indiana Avenue in the Black Metropolis-Bronzeville District of the Douglas community area of Chicago, Illinois, housed the Chicago Defender from 1920 until 1960. Designed by Henry L. Newhouse, it was originally a synagogue. The building was designated a Chicago Landmark on September 9, 1998.

Gallery

Notes

African-American history in Chicago
Chicago Landmarks
Buildings and structures in Chicago
Douglas, Chicago
Religious buildings and structures completed in 1899
19th-century synagogues
Jews and Judaism in Chicago